Borgo Santa Maria may refer to:

Borgo Santa Maria, Latina, a village in the province of Latina, Italy
Borgo Santa Maria, Montelibretti, a village in the metropolitan city of Rome, Italy
Borgo Santa Maria, Pesaro, a village in the province of Pesaro, Italy
Borgo Santa Maria Immacolata, a village in the province of Teramo, Italy